The Special Envoy for Hostage Affairs, or more formally the Office of the Special Presidential Envoy for Hostage Affairs, was established in 2015 by an executive order pertaining to the recovery of U.S. hostages taken abroad. The special envoy leads and coordinates activities across the Executive Branch to bring home Americans held hostage in other countries. The position was created in 2015 during the Obama administration.  

In February 2020, President Trump announced his intention to appoint Roger D. Carstens as the next Special Envoy.  

In January of 2021, incoming President Joseph R. Biden and incoming Secretary of State Antony Blinken requested that Roger Carstens stay on into the Biden Administration.

Special Envoys

References

External links

 United States Department of State: Office of the Special Presidential Envoy for Hostage Affairs
 Announcing the Special Envoy for Hostage Affairs